Nichola Pease (born April 1961) is a British fund manager.

According to The Sunday Times Rich List in 2019, Pease and her husband Crispin Odey are worth £775 million.

Early life
Nichola Pease was born in April 1961. Her father, Sir Richard Pease, 3rd Baronet, was a banker. Her mother is Anne Heyworth.

She received a bachelor's degree in English from the University of Exeter.

Career
Pease started her career in finance at Kleinwort Benson in 1983. In 1985, she joined Smith New Court and by 1989, she was a director.

She served as the chief executive officer (CEO) of J.O. Hambro Capital Management from 1998 to 2008, while James Hambro was the chairman. She stepped down as deputy chairman in 2008, when she was replaced as CEO by Gavin Rochussen. Upon its 2011 merger with BT Investment Management, an Australian financial firm, she earned a third of £124 million.

She was on the board of directors of Northern Rock from 1999 to 2007. She was a director of Grainger plc from 2001 to 2005. She is a non-executive director of Schroders.

In 2019, Pease was appointed by Jupiter Fund Management as non-executive chairman.

Personal life
She married Crispin Odey, a hedge fund manager, in 1991. They have three children.

References

1961 births
Alumni of the University of Exeter
Bankers from London
British corporate directors
Daughters of baronets
Living people
Northern Rock
Nichola Pease
People from Chelsea, London
People from Forest of Dean District
Schroders people
Nichola Pease